Xinqiao is a town of Anlong County in southwestern Guizhou province, China, located  west-northwest of the county seat and  east of Xingyi, both of which can be reached by China National Highway 324. , it has one residential community and eight villages under its administration.

References 

Towns in Guizhou